Yousuf Shah (born 18 February 1995) is an Afghan cricketer. He made his first-class debut for Khost Province in the 2018–19 Mirwais Nika Provincial 3-Day tournament on 15 February 2019. He made his List A debut for Paktia Province in the 2019 Afghanistan Provincial Challenge Cup tournament on 31 July 2019.

References

External links
 

1995 births
Living people
Afghan cricketers
Place of birth missing (living people)